Apsinthii is the name of a Thracian tribe mentioned by Herodotus. The Apsinthii were located east of the Dolonci, another Thracian tribe, and on Chersonesos. It was due to them that Miltiades erected a wall from Cardia to Pactye.

See also
Zerynthus
List of Thracian tribes

References

Ancient tribes in Thrace
Thracian tribes